Chopoqlu (also Romanized as Chopoqlū; also known as Chabqolū, Choboqlū, and Jabūk’alū) is a village in Khvor Khvoreh Rural District, in the Central District of Bijar County, Kurdistan Province, Iran. At the 2006 census, its population was 315, in 65 families. The village is populated by Azerbaijanis.

References 

Towns and villages in Bijar County
Azerbaijani settlements in Kurdistan Province